Torab-e Vosta (also Romanized as Torāb-e Vosţá) is a village in Rak Rural District, in the Central District of Kohgiluyeh County, Kohgiluyeh and Boyer-Ahmad Province, Iran.

Population
At the 2006 census, its population was 163, in 41 families.

References 

Populated places in Kohgiluyeh County